The third season of the Indonesian reality talent show The Voice Kids Indonesia premiered in 2018 on GTV with Agnez Mo returning as coach. Kaka Satriaji and Marcell Siahaan replaced Bebi Romeo and Tulus, respectively.

Auditions

Coaches & Hosts

Coach 
Kaka Satriaji 
Agnez Mo
Marcell Siahaan

Host 
 Ananda Omesh
 Dian Ayu Lestari
 Kimberley Fransa

Teams
Color key:

Blind auditions
Color key:

Episode 1 (June 28)

Episode 2 (July 5)

Episode 3 (July 12)

Episode 4 (July 19)

Episode 5 (July 26)

Episode 6 (August 2)

Episode 7 (August 9)

Episode 8 (August 16)

The Battles 

The third season's advisors include: Citra Scholastika for Team Kaka, Sammy Simorangkir for Team Agnez and Rini Wulandari for Team Marcell.

Color key:

Live Shows 

Color key

Week 1 

During the first Live Shows, the 12 artists performed for the votes of the public. The artist with the highest number of votes on each team directly advanced to the Semifinals. Then, on the end of the show, each coach completing their respective teams with their own choice.

Week 2 

During the first Live Shows, the 12 artists performed for the votes of the public. The artist who picked by their own coach directly advanced to the Semifinals. Then, on the end of the show, The artist with the highest number of votes on each team completing their respective teams.

Semifinals 

During the Semifinals, the 12 artists performed for the votes of the public. The artist who picked by their own coach directly advanced to the Finals. Then, on the end of the show, The artist with the highest number of votes on each team completing their respective teams.

Finals 

All finalist performed on October 4, 2018. During the Finals, the 6 artists performed for the votes of the public. The 3 artists with the highest number of votes directly advanced to the Top 3.

 Grand Final

 Finale

Elimination Chart

Overall
Color key 
Artist's info
 
 

Result details

Teams
Color key
Artist's info

Results details

Artists who appeared on previous shows or season
 Tyara Rafanaura appeared on the fifth season of Idola Cilik  and finished in third place.
 Siti Manzilah appeared on the first season of Indonesian Idol Junior. 
 Reink Ferguson and Angela Nitti auditioned for the first season, but failed to turn any chairs.
 Akilah Nasywa appeared on the first season of La Academia Junior Indonesia and finished in third place.
 Erwyn Sunyoto and Nadhia Aryasa auditioned for the second season, but failed to turn any chairs.
 Catherine Evelyna appeared on the second season of Indonesian Idol Junior.

References 

The Voice Indonesia